In the pre-Inca mythology of the Lake Titicaca Ka-Ata-Killa is the moon goddess.

See also
 List of lunar deities

References

Inca goddesses

Lunar goddesses